Chief Andrew Akpan Inyang-Etoh (1904 -1974) was a renowned community leader of the Annang ethnic group who was fondly called "Akpan Umoren Akpan, "Akpan Igwe" and
"Noah". He was born in the present day Ukana Ikot Etan village which was extracted from the "Ekpuk Itiaita" (Eight group of Families) that constituted the Ukana Ikot Ofok Village in Essien Udim Local Government Area, Akwa Ibom State, Nigeria. Chief Andrew Akpan Inyang-Etoh was the first man within the Ukana Ikot Ofok community to get his first two sons, Bernard and Columba, to enroll in the prestigious Holy Family College, Oku Abak. Rt. Rev. Msgr. Peter Inyang-Etoh is one of five sons, a distinguished Catholic Priest of Ikot Ekpene Diocese, an educationist, a friend of the needy and a disciplinarian, currently serving as the Governing Council Member of Akwa Ibom State University. He is the founder of Late Chief Andrew Akpan Inyang-Etoh Education Foundation.

Social & political life
Chief Andrew was born into the royal family of "Inyang-Etoh Etan" and succeeded Chief Udo Udoi as the village head of Ukana Ikot Etan. He was a counselor and peace-maker in the community. He also served as a member of the Central Annang County Council for 17 years. During his service years at the Central Annang County Council, he helped establish the Government Primary School, Ikot Ofok. He also pioneered the establishment of Co-operative society to help petty traders and farmers within the community to obtain loan at a low interest rate to finance their trade or the education of their children.

He was the president of St. Joseph Catholic Church, Ikot Ofok till his death. He was one of the first within the Annang land to head a church and a village at the same time as many of the other village heads where core traditionalist.

Legacy
Contribution to religious unity

As a community leader, the Ikot Ofok group of villages were the first Christian Community to set up a Christian Council. The Christian council united the Christian churches within the community and was pioneered by three member churches: Catholic Church, African Church and Salvation Army Church. Some of the functions of this council included occasional organization of inter-denominational worship to mark end of the year and organization of burials for members.

Contribution to education

He was the first man in the community to send his first two sons, Bernard and Columba to the prestigious Holy Family College, Oku Abak when his contemporaries were sending their children to Teachers' Training College. Parents and youths who aspired secondary education often came to him for his wise counsel. He encouraged other members of the community to send their children to school and also offered financial support whenever he could. He ensured that all his male children were educated.

References

1904 births
1974 deaths
Annang